Carson Park may refer to:

Parks in the United States
 Carson Park (baseball stadium), Eau Claire, Wisconsin
 Carson Park (Eau Claire, Wisconsin)
 Johnny Carson Park, Burbank, California
 Kit Carson Park, Escondido, California
 Lang-Carson Park, Reynoldstown, Atlanta, Georgia
 A park in Indianapolis, Indiana

Other uses
 Carson Park (baseball stadium), in Wisconsin
 A neighborhood in Long Beach, California; see Long Beach Fire Department

See also
 Carson Parks (1936–2005), American songwriter